Ishme-Dagan (Diš-me-Dda-gan, Išme-Dagān; fl. c. 1889 BC — c. 1871 BC by the short chronology of the ancient near east) was the 4th king of the First Dynasty of Isin, according to the "Sumerian King List" (SKL). Also according to the SKL: he was both the son and successor of Iddin-Dagān. Lipit-Ištar then succeeded Išme-Dagān. Išme-Dagān was one of the kings to restore the Ekur.

See also

 Isin
 Sumer
 Amorites
 History of Sumer
 Sumerian people

References

Amorite kings
19th-century BC Sumerian kings
Dynasty of Isin